The 2013 Southeastern Conference women's basketball tournament was the postseason women's basketball tournament for the Southeastern Conference held from March 6 to 10, 2013 in Duluth, Georgia at the Arena at Gwinnett Center. The first and second rounds and the quarterfinal round was televised through FSS and SPSO, and the semifinals and finals was broadcast nationally on ESPNU and ESPN2.

Format
With the addition of Missouri and Texas A&M to the league, the tournament likewise expanded to 14 teams. As in previous years, the top four teams received byes to the quarterfinals; these byes became double-byes with the addition of a new round featuring the four lowest seeds (11 through 14; seeds 5 through 10 receive a single bye into the second round).  After these matchups on the first day, the rest of the tournament proceeded as in previous years, with the 11/14 and 12/13 winners facing, respectively, seeds 6 and 5, and seeds 7 & 10 and 8 & 9 also squaring off in the second round.  The four winners on the second day joined the top four seeds in the quarterfinals.

This year, Ole Miss chose to self-impose a post-season ban, so the teams were seeded 1–13, and the 11 seed received a single-bye.

Schedule

Bracket

References

SEC
SEC women's basketball tournament
2013 in sports in Georgia (U.S. state)